Hugh Garahan (died 7 June 1940) was an Irish politician. A farmer, he was an unsuccessful candidate at the 1923 general election. He was first elected to Dáil Éireann at the June 1927 general election as a Farmers' Party Teachta Dála (TD) for the Longford–Westmeath constituency. He lost his seat at the September 1927 general election. 

In 1931 he was elected to the Free State Seanad and was re-elected to the Seanad in 1934, where he was a member of Cumann na nGaedheal and later Fine Gael.

References

Year of birth missing
1940 deaths
Farmers' Party (Ireland) TDs
Members of the 5th Dáil
Members of the 1931 Seanad
Members of the 1934 Seanad
Irish farmers
Cumann na nGaedheal senators
Fine Gael senators